This is a list of countries by the Human Development Index as included in the United Nations Development Programme's Human Development Report organized by continent or other international regions. The Human Development Index (HDI) is a summary index assessing countries on 3 dimensions, health, education and standard of living using life expectancy at birth, expected years of schooling for children and mean years of schooling for adults, and GNI per capita. The final HDI is a value between 0 and 1 with countries grouped into four categories depending on the value, very high for HDI of 0.800 and above, high from 0.700 to 0.799, medium from 0.550 to 0.699 and low below 0.550.

List of countries by continent

Africa 

10 highest HDIs

10 lowest HDIs

Asia 

10 highest HDIs

10 lowest HDIs

Europe 

10 highest HDIs

10 lowest HDIs

North America 

10 highest HDIs

10 lowest HDIs

Oceania

South America

List of countries by intercontinental region

Arab States 

10 highest HDIs

10 lowest HDIs

Commonwealth of Nations 

10 highest HDIs

10 lowest HDIs

East Asia and the Pacific 

10 highest HDIs

10 lowest HDIs

European Union 

10 highest HDIs

10 lowest HDIs

OECD 

10 highest HDIs

10 lowest HDIs

Organisation of Islamic Cooperation 

10 highest HDIs

10 lowest HDIs

Small Island Developing States 

10 highest HDIs

10 lowest HDIs

See also
 List of countries by Human Development Index
 List of countries by inequality-adjusted Human Development Index
 List of countries by planetary pressures–adjusted Human Development Index

References

External links 
 UN Development Programme Human Development Reports

Region